USAF Tactical Air Support Squadron may refer to:
 19th Tactical Air Support Squadron
 20th Tactical Air Support Squadron
 21st Tactical Air Support Squadron
 22nd Tactical Air Support Squadron
 23d Tactical Air Support Squadron
 24th Tactical Air Support Squadron
 25th Tactical Air Support Squadron
 27th Tactical Air Support Squadron
 169th Tactical Air Support Squadron
 172d Tactical Air Support Squadron
 178th Tactical Air Support Squadron
 556th Tactical Air Support Squadron
 557th Tactical Air Support Squadron
 558th Tactical Air Support Squadron
 601st Tactical Air Support Squadron
 701st Tactical Air Support Squadron
 702nd Tactical Air Support Squadron
 757th Tactical Air Support Squadron

See also
 List of United States Air Force support squadrons